Bruno Cherrier (born 31 August 1953) is a French former athlete who competed in the 1972 Summer Olympics.

References

1953 births
Living people
French male sprinters
Olympic athletes of France
Athletes (track and field) at the 1972 Summer Olympics
European Athletics Championships medalists